This is a list of universities and other higher education institutions in Chile, namely Professional Institutes (IP) and Technical Training Centers (CFT).

Universities 

In the Chilean higher education system, there are 61 universities, with over 750.000 students. Of these, 46 are accredited by the Chilean National Accreditation Commission, representing 94% of the total student registration.

Universities founded before 1981, or which can be traced before that year, are known as Traditional Universities.
Two Universities, Universidad de O'Higgins and Universidad de Aysén, are two public universities created in 2015, receiving their first students in 2017.

Professional Institutes

Technical Training Centers

See also
Chilean Traditional Universities
List of colleges and universities by country
List of colleges and universities

Notes

References

External links 
 Universities in Chile by region

Education in Chile
Universities and colleges
Chile
Lists
Chile